Ala al-Din wa-l-Dawla Abu'l-Muzaffar Atsiz ibn Muhammad ibn Anushtegin (1098 – 1156), better known as Atsiz was the second Khwarazmshah from 1127/8 to 1156. He was the son and successor of Muhammad I.

Ruler of Khwarazm

Warfare with the Seljuk suzerain 
Atsïz gained his position following his father's death in 1127 or 1128. During the early part of his reign, he focused on securing Khwarazm against nomad attacks. In 1138, he rebelled against his suzerain, the Seljuk Sultan Ahmad Sanjar, but was defeated in Hazarasp and forced to flee. Sanjar installed his nephew Suleiman Shah as ruler of Khwarazm and returned to Merv. Atsïz returned, however, and Suleiman Shah was unable to hold on to the province. Atsïz then attacked Bukhara, but by 1141 he again submitted to Sanjar, who pardoned him and formally returned control of Khwarazm over to him.

The same year that Sanjar pardoned Atsïz, the Kara Khitai under Yelü Dashi defeated the Seljuks at Qatwan, near Samarkand. Atsïz took advantage of the defeat to invade Khorasan, occupying Merv and Nishapur. Yelü Dashi, however, sent a force to plunder Khwarazm, forcing Atsïz to pay an annual tribute.

In 1142, Atsiz was expelled from Khorasan by Sanjar, who invaded Khwarazm in the following year and forced Atsïz back into vassalage, although Atsïz continued to pay tribute to the Kara Khitai until his death. Sanjar undertook another expedition against Atsïz in 1147 when the latter became rebellious again.

In 1153, Sanjar was defeated and imprisoned by a group of Oghuz tribes, and Khorasan soon descended into anarchy. The portion of the Seljuk army that refused to join the Oghuz proclaimed the former ruler of the Karakhanids, Mahmud Khan, as their leader. Mahmud sought an alliance with Atsïz against the Oghuz, while Atsïz's brother Ïnal-Tegin had already plundered a part of Khorasan in 1154. Atsïz and his son Il-Arslan departed from Khwarazm, but before they could make any gains Sanjar escaped from his captivity and restored his rule.

Death 
Atsïz died in 1156 and was succeeded by Il-Arslan.

Evaluation of reign 
Atsiz was a flexible politician and ruler, and was able to maneuver between the powerful Sultan Sanjar and equally powerful Yelü Dashi. He continued the land-gathering policy initiated by his predecessors, annexing Jand and Mangyshlak to Khwarazm. Many nomadic tribes were dependent on the Khwarazmshah. Towards the end of his life, Atsiz subordinated the entire northwestern part of Central Asia, and in fact, achieved its independence from the neighbors.

Culture 
Contrary to the early Seljuk rulers, the first Khwarazmshahs were literate. The Khwarazmian grammarian and lexicographer al-Zamakhshari dedicated his Arabic dictionary of Muqaddimat al-adab to Atsiz. Ata-Malik Juvayni and Aufi praised Atsiz for his literacy and expertise in writing Persian poetry. Atsiz is often addressed in the panegyric qasidas of his poet laureate and chief secretary Rashid al-Din Vatvat (died 1182/3).

References

Sources
 
 
 
 
Boyle, J. A. . The Cambridge History of Iran Volume 5: The Saljuq and Mongol Periods. Cambridge, UK: Cambridge University Press, 1968.
 
 
 
 

1156 deaths
Khwarezmid rulers
Year of birth unknown
12th-century Turkic people
Anushtegin dynasty

ca:Atsiz ibn Muhammad ibn Anuixtigin